Anneka Stephens (born 4 September 1989) is a New Zealand rugby league footballer who played for the St George Illawarra Dragons in the NRL Women's Premiership. She has represented Cook Islands in rugby sevens.

Background
Stephens was born in Invercargill, where she played touch football and rugby union before moving to Perth, Western Australia.

Playing career

Rugby league
In Perth, Stephens played rugby league for the Joondalup Giants in the women's NRLWA competition.

In June 2018, Stephens represented the Combined Affiliated States at the Women's National Championships. On 27 June 2018, she signed with the St George Illawarra Dragons in the NRL Women's Premiership.

She played all three games for the Dragons in 2018, starting all of them at hooker.

Rugby sevens
In 2016, she represented the Cook Islands at the 2016 Rugby World Women's Sevens Olympic Repechage Tournament in Dublin.

References

External links
RLP

1989 births
Living people
New Zealand sportspeople of Cook Island descent
New Zealand female rugby league players
Rugby league hookers
St. George Illawarra Dragons (NRLW) players